The Bukovel-AD is a Ukrainian anti-drone electronic warfare system.

Description
The Bukovel-AD is a counter-unmanned aircraft system (CUAS) produced by the Ukrainian firm Proximus. It is designed to detect unmanned aerial vehicles (UAVs) at up to 100 km range and jam data transmission between the UAV and its controllers at 20 km. It can block GPS, GLONASS, Galileo, and Beidou positioning systems. The system can be mounted on various vehicles, as well as on tripods and takes two minutes to deploy.

Operational History
The Ukrainian Armed Forces have used the Bukovel-AD in the war in Donbass, bringing down Russian Orlan-10 drones.

Operators
 
 Armed Forces of Ukraine - several dozen units in service.

 
 Royal Moroccan Army

References

External links 

 Manufacturer's website: Proximus LLC

Counter unmanned air system
Weapons countermeasures
Military equipment introduced in the 2010s
Ukrainian inventions